Alexandria is a town in the parish of Saint Ann, Jamaica.

The Armadale Juvenile Correctional Centre of the Department of Correctional Services, Jamaica was located in Alexandria. On 22 May 2009 a fire went through the facility, killing 5 girls and injuring 13 girls. The replacement facility is located in Diamond Crest Villa near Alligator Pond in Manchester Parish.

References 

Populated places in Saint Ann Parish

pl:Alligator Pond